General Ewing may refer to:

Charles Ewing (general) (1835–1883), Union Army brigadier general
Hugh Boyle Ewing (1826–1905), Union Army brigadier general and brevet major general
James Ewing (Pennsylvania politician) (1736–1806), Pennsylvania Militia brigadier general
Thomas Ewing Jr. (1829–1896), Union Army brevet major general